40th BSFC Awards
December 15, 2019

Best Film: 
Little Women

The 40th Boston Society of Film Critics Awards, honoring the best in filmmaking in 2019, were given on December 15, 2019.

Winners

 Best Film:
 Little Women
 Runner-up: Portrait of a Lady on Fire
 Best Director:
 Bong Joon-ho – Parasite
 Runner-up: Greta Gerwig – Little Women
 Best Actor:
 Adam Sandler – Uncut Gems
 Runner-up: Joaquin Phoenix – Joker
 Best Actress:
 Saoirse Ronan – Little Women
 Runners-up: Elisabeth Moss – Her Smell / Mary Kay Place – Diane
 Best Supporting Actor:
 Brad Pitt – Once Upon a Time in Hollywood
 Runner-up: Joe Pesci – The Irishman
 Best Supporting Actress:
 Laura Dern – Marriage Story
 Runner-up: Florence Pugh – Little Women
 Best Screenplay:
 Quentin Tarantino – Once Upon a Time in Hollywood
 Runners-up: Noah Baumbach – Marriage Story / Greta Gerwig – Little Women
 Best Animated Film:
 I Lost My Body
 Runner-up: Toy Story 4
 Best Foreign Language Film:
 Parasite
 Runner-up: Portrait of a Lady on Fire
 Best Documentary:
 Honeyland
 Runners-up: Apollo 11 / Hail Satan?
 Best Cinematography:
 Claire Mathon – Portrait of a Lady on Fire
 Runner-up: Robert Richardson – Once Upon a Time in Hollywood
 Best Editing:
 Thelma Schoonmaker – The Irishman
 Runner-up: Ronald Bronstein and Josh Safdie – Uncut Gems
 Best Original Score:
 Alexandre Desplat – Little Women
 Runner-up: Emile Mosseri – The Last Black Man in San Francisco
 Best New Filmmaker:
 Joe Talbot – The Last Black Man in San Francisco
 Runner-up: Mati Diop – Atlantics
 Best Ensemble Cast:
 Little Women
 Runners-up: Once Upon a Time in Hollywood / Parasite

References

External links
 Official website

2019
2019 film awards
2019 awards in the United States
2019 in Boston
December 2019 events in the United States